Beta Boötis, Latinized from β Boötis, and also named Nekkar , is a star in the northern constellation of Boötes. It has an apparent visual magnitude of 3.5, making it one of the brighter members of the constellation. In the modern constellation, it marks the head of Boötis the herdsman. At that distance, the magnitude of the star is reduced by 0.06 from extinction caused by intervening gas and dust.

Nomenclature
β Boötis (Latinised to Beta Boötis) is the star's Bayer designation.

It bore the traditional name Nekkar or Nakkar derived from the Arabic name for the constellation: Al Baḳḳār 'the Herdsman'. In 2016, the International Astronomical Union organized a Working Group on Star Names (WGSN) to catalogue and standardize proper names for stars. The WGSN approved the name Nekkar for this star on 21 August 2016 and it is now so included in the List of IAU-approved Star Names.

Properties
Nakkar has more than three times the mass of the Sun and greater than 21 times the Sun's radius. (König et al. (2006) give it 3.4 solar masses, while Tetzlaff et al. (2011) list a higher estimated mass of  solar masses and Takeda et al. (2008) show it as 3.24 solar masses.) The star is radiating around 170–194 times as much luminosity as the Sun from its outer envelope at an effective temperature of 4,932 K. This heat gives it the yellow-hued glow of a G-type star. It has an estimated rotation period of about 200 days and the pole is inclined  to the line of sight from the Earth.

In 1993, the ROSAT satellite was used to observe an X-ray flare on Beta Boötis, which released an estimated . This was the first such observation for a low-activity star of this type. The flare may be explained by an as yet unobserved M-type dwarf companion star.

References

External links
 Image Beta Boötis
 The Constellations and Named Stars
 Nekkar at University of Illinois

Bootis, 42
Flare stars
133208
073555
Bootis, Beta
Boötes
G-type giants
Nekkar
5602
BD+40 2840